ARCHIVE Global is an international non-profit organization that focuses on the link between health and housing. ARCHIVE stands for Architecture for Health In Vulnerable Environments. ARCHIVE Global was founded by Utne Reader visionary Peter Williams in 2006.  Initially started in the United States, the organization welcomed ARCHIVE UK, its first affiliate based in the United Kingdom in 2009.  ARCHIVE currently has ongoing projects in Bangladesh, Cameroon, Haiti, and the UK.  Projects implement design solutions in housing to combat diseases such as HIV/AIDS, Tuberculosis, Malaria, respiratory diseases, diarrheal diseases, and neglected tropical diseases.  ARCHIVE Global is the winner of the 2013 Katerva Award for Urban Design, and was also named by Forbes magazine as one of the World's Best Sustainability ideas.

Mission and Approach
ARCHIVE Global focuses on combating diseases among the most vulnerable communities around the world through better housing design.  On a preventative level, the organization advocates renovating inadequate housing for the economically disadvantaged in a bid to reduce their vulnerability to disease and ill health. It advocates a treatment-based approach by the creation of home-based care facilities for those already suffering from ill health thus making housing central to the delivery of suitable care. "Clean, warm housing is an essential input for prevention and care of diseases of poverty like HIV/AIDS, Tuberculosis, Diarrhea, and Malaria."

ARCHIVE's approach utilizes research, construction, and training to create a sustainable model for implementing an integrated, systems approach to housing and health.  It is meant to target the health challenges faced by individual households and provides them with the skills to sustain these changes in the future.  ARCHIVE's building initiatives are intended to promote sustainability and involvement among communities and community members.  Meetings are held with the communities to discuss the health challenges faced as well as the ways that design improvements target specific goals.  Individuals are trained to evaluate the conditions of their home, as well as utilize local materials and techniques to build healthier homes. In doing so, housing and health are improved, whilst a burden is lifted off public health services.  Through this model, ARCHIVE works to ensure greater productivity within households, along with skills creation, greater employment opportunities and income. Moreover, the cost of projects is offset by using community 'sweat equity' and existing local finance facilities.

Currently ARCHIVE Global is the only organization working globally to prioritize a combined health and housing approach to improve lives while encouraging communities to invest in identifying and creating solutions.

History
ARCHIVE Global was founded by Peter Williams. ARCHIVE was developed from a three-year independent research project at Columbia University where Williams trained as an architect. His research reinforced the basic link between housing and health outcomes in South African communities. In 2005, Williams created a blog to encourage debate around public health policy, planning, epidemics, and architecture. This led to the formation of ARCHIVE Global in New York, in 2006 followed by ARCHIVE UK three years later.

Current Projects

UK

In 2010 ARCHIVE UK launched the Happy, Healthy Households Partnership with NHS Brent, the Brent Council, the Brent Refugee and Migrant Forum and various community organizations. The purpose of the partnership is to raise awareness of the link between Tuberculosis and housing. The focus is on the London Borough of Brent, as it has the highest rate of TB of any London Borough, after Newham, with 101.12 new cases per 100,000 of population. The majority of those cases occur among minority communities.

ARCHIVE UK has continued community based awareness raising workshops and events beyond the Happy, Healthy Households project and has plans to extend into Newham in the near future.

Haiti

In Haiti, ARCHIVE Global works in partnership with Housing Works and Foundation Esther Boucicault Stanislas (FEBS). FEBS is a community organization based in Saint-Marc that provides access to medicine and works to improve the quality of life for people living with HIV/AIDS.

In 2010, six months after the 2010 Haiti earthquake ARCHIVE Global launched Kay e Sante nan Ayiti (Creole for Housing and Health in Haiti), a project to raise awareness of how housing can form part of a strategy to reduce the transmission of airborne diseases such as TB. As an integral part of the project, a global design competition called on architects, engineers, health specialists and the general public to pool their knowledge and submit housing designs which would mitigate disease transmission while remaining sympathetic to the local environment.  An interdisciplinary panel of judges and the local community chose five winning designs for construction in an integrated community development and healthcare pilot project in the coastal port town of Saint-Marc, in western Haiti, an hour's drive from the capital, Port-au-Prince.

Construction began in 2011 on the prototype houses. The winning design, 'Breathe House' was constructed in 2012 by local community members, ARCHIVE Global and volunteers from reCOVER initiative of the University of Virginia and BGF (Building Goodness Foundation).

Cameroon

In 2011, ARCHIVE Global began work in Yaoundé on a project to reduce the prevalence of malaria in informal settlements.  On World Malaria Day in March 2012 an international design competition was launched to find architectural solutions to protect against malaria.  Winning designs were announced in October 2012.  These designs use screened doors, windows and eaves, and adequate ventilation, sewage and drainage solutions to directly halt vector mosquitoes and reduce the incidence of malaria.

Through partnerships with local organizations, ARCHIVE creates awareness regarding the important role of housing in the effective elimination of malaria in Cameroon and to involve both global and local actors in all stages of the project. The main objectives of the project include training people in home improvements for disease prevention, improving living conditions for households, improving awareness of malaria prevention, reducing malaria incidences, and developing best practice guidelines for malaria control through housing design.  Final evaluation of the project will be conducted by early 2016.

Bangladesh

In 2013, ARCHIVE drafted the plans for Health From the Ground Up, a project targeted towards reducing infant and child mortality in the Bangladeshi capital of Dhaka.  Deprivations in living standards (such as flooring and sanitation) contribute to nearly half of all multi-dimensional poverty experienced in Bangladesh.  To overcome the burden of unhygienic and unsanitary housing conditions among those most vulnerable to infectious diseases, ARCHIVE collaborated with ADESH (Association for Development of Economic and Social Help) to establish a pilot-flooring project in 2014. The "Health From the Ground Up" initiative served to replace dirt/mud floors with concrete flooring in Bangladeshi homes and, through this intervention, target a major transmission pathway for gastrointestinal and parasitic pathogens.

The project also sought to raise awareness on other basic environmental and housing interventions that can have positive impacts on health to enhance knowledge and provide participants with skills so that they may better spread these ideas throughout the community.

Future Projects
ARCHIVE is in the process of expanding projects to other regions of the world.  Currently under way are projects addressing sanitation needs in slum dwellings in Brazil, as well as using preventative housing and design measures to decrease the transmission of Chagas disease in Bolivia.  ARCHIVE also seeks to expand projects domestically, hoping to address inadequate housing for disadvantaged communities in the United States.

Recognition
ARCHIVE Global was named by UBS as Charity of the Year in 2012.  In 2013, ARCHIVE was the winner of the Katerva Award in Urban Design.  Various news outlets have recognized ARCHIVE's work, such as The Guardian, Forbes magazine, ArchDaily, BBC, and NPR among others.

References

External links
 ARCHIVE Global's website
 The Guardian, ARCHIVE Global: Fighting Disease With Low-Tech, Low-Cost Home Design
 The World's Best Sustainability Ideas
 Interview With Peter Williams: Building a Healthy Home
 Mashable Interviews Peter Williams
 Architectural Record Article About Haiti Project

Non-profit organizations based in New York (state)
Organizations based in New York City
Organizations established in 2006